Traveling the Stars: Action Bronson and Friends Watch Ancient Aliens (alternately titled Action Bronson Watches Ancient Aliens) is a comedy-documentary series hosted by American rapper Action Bronson. It was produced by Viceland and aired in 2016.

On June 4, 2019, the series was revived and renewed for a second season which premiered on August 5, 2019.

About
The show focuses on rapper Action Bronson sitting on a couch, smoking marijuana with his friends, and watching episodes of History's Ancient Aliens, from Viceland's sister network. Bronson is most often accompanied by music producers The Alchemist and Knxwledge, his “Albanian cousin” Big Body Bes, and various guest stars, including musicians, actors, and other associates of his. According to producers Jordan Kinley and Hannah Gregg, the show was conceived as a way to address disgruntled viewers of H2, the network that formerly aired Ancient Aliens before being replaced by Viceland on cable carriers in the United States. The show is notable for its use of greenscreen. The participants watch Ancient Aliens on a monitor while the show is greenscreened behind them. Objects float around in the background while the guests smoke in the foreground. The original Ancient Aliens show supports the ancient astronauts theory popularized by author Erich von Däniken.

The show is free-form and unscripted, and Gregg says that they "literally will not tell [the guests] what they're supposed to do" (though content is edited for advertiser and viewer appropriateness, where required). Each episode is blocked for an hour, giving an average runtime of 44 minutes.

Episodes

Season 1 (2016)

Season 2 (2019)

See also
Fuck, That's Delicious
The Untitled Action Bronson Show

References

2016 American television series debuts
2019 American television series endings
2010s American mockumentary television series
American television series revived after cancellation
English-language television shows
American television series about cannabis
Viceland original programming